Kampong Bebatik is a village in Brunei-Muara District, Brunei. The population was 1,409 in 2016. It is one of the villages within Mukim Pengkalan Batu. The postcode is BH3223.

References 

Bebatik